Clément Giraud (born 11 December 1980) is a French professional offshore sailor.

Biography
Clement lived until his 18th birthday in the Caribbean on the Island of Martinique, where did lots of recreational sailing without ever joining a sailing club. He moved to France living and working on sailing boat in Mandelieu, and then raced semi-professionally, participating four times in the Tour de France à la voile.

He has competed in 129 regattas and races, in multihulls and monohulls, racing globally with more than 25 victories and 40 podiums and 135,000 miles covered onboard which includes 20,000 in double handed and 22,000 solo before he competed in the 2020–2021 Vendée Globe the pinnacle of Solo Oceanic Offshore racing. He had a difficult build up to the Vendee Globe with a fire starting on his boat hours before a qualifying race leading to him borrowing a boat from Erik Nigon for the race.

Results

References

External links
 
 

1980 births
Living people
Martiniquais people in sports
French male sailors (sport)
IMOCA 60 class sailors
French Vendee Globe sailors
2020 Vendee Globe sailors
Vendée Globe finishers